Mary Frances Williams (born June 26, 1955) is an American politician. She serves as a member of the Georgia House of Representatives from Jan. 15, 2019. On November 8, 2018, she defeated the Republican Sam Teasley in a closely contested election. During the 2018 United States elections, Williams listed access to healthcare as her number one priority as a would-be legislator. She also stated that she supported universal background check as a prerequisite to gun ownership and keeping guns out of hands of domestic violence offenders.

References

Democratic Party members of the Georgia House of Representatives

21st-century American politicians
Living people
People from Marietta, Georgia

21st-century American women politicians
Women state legislators in Georgia (U.S. state)

1955 births